Richard Bright may refer to:

Richard Bright (physician) (1789–1858), English physician and early pioneer in the research of kidney disease
Richard Bright (politician) (1822–1878), English Member of Parliament, 1868–1878 (nephew of the above)
Richard Bright (actor) (1937–2006), American actor

See also
Rick Bright (born 1966), American immunologist